The Norman Wood Bridge carries Pennsylvania Route 372 across the Susquehanna River between York County, Pennsylvania and Lancaster County, Pennsylvania. It was constructed in two years and opened for use on August 21, 1968. Its namesake served more than 40 years in the Pennsylvania House of Representatives.

On September 28, 2015, the bridge was closed abruptly because an inspector found a crack in one of the steel girders; it reopened with one lane of traffic on October 16, 2015 and all restrictions were removed on November 2, 2015. Engineers from Lehigh University were asked to determine the cause of crack, which was repaired by bolting two steel plates over the 14-foot-long vertical girder.

References 

Bridges over the Susquehanna River
Bridges in York County, Pennsylvania
Bridges in Lancaster County, Pennsylvania
Road bridges in Pennsylvania
Steel bridges in the United States
Girder bridges in the United States